Big Bang is the fifth studio album by the Finnish avant-garde progressive metal band Waltari, released in 1995.

The album produced two singles, both with promotional videos: Atmosfear and The Stage. These singles are two of the three Waltari compositions to reach the top 20 in the Finnish charts. Atmosfear peaked at 6 and The Stage at 15. The album itself reached a high of 7 in the national charts and was their second most successful album.

Reception 
At sputnikmusic.com the album received 4.1 out of 5. Allmusic.com also rated it as 4 out of 5. At rateyourmusic.com one reviewer likened them to a poor imitation of Faith No More with only two songs worthy of note. Other reviews are more positive. Overall the most common vote on this site is 4 out of 5.

Track listing

Credits

Kärtsy Hatakka - Vocals, Bass, Keyboards
Jariot Lehtinen - Guitar, vocals
Sami Yli-Sirniö – Guitar, keyboards, vocals, bass (track 1, 7 and 13).
Janne Parviainen - Drums

Guest Musicians

Aino Roivainen – Vocals (track 3)
Tomi Koivusaari – Death vocals (track 6)
Angelin Tytöt – Joiking vocals (track 9)

Production
Arranged By Mikko Karmila (track 11), Petri Herranen (track 14), Waltari
Artwork – Robert Brotherus
Mastered By – Pauli Saastamoinen
Photography By [Back Cover] – Sameli Rantanen 
Photography By [Band] – John Vihervä 
Photography By [Booklet] – Esko Kuusisto 
Producer, Engineer, Mixed By – Mikko Karmila

Charts

References

External links
Encyclopaedia Metallum page

Waltari albums
1995 albums